Adrián Ezequiel Yospe (12 February 1970 – 10 November 2011) was an Argentine actor. He appeared in 13 films between 1991 and 2011.

Filmography
 La peste (1991)
 Caballos salvajes (1995)
 Más allá del límite (1995)
 La maestra normal (1996)
 Pizza, birra, faso (1997)
 Es todo (1999)
 La venganza (1999)
 La casa de Tourner (2001)
 ¿Y dónde está el bebé? (2002)
 Apasionados (2002)
 Dibu 3, la gran aventura (2002)
 555 (2011)
 Juan y Eva (2011)

References

External links
 

1970 births
2011 deaths
Argentine male film actors
Male actors from Buenos Aires
Deaths from cancer in Argentina
20th-century Argentine male actors
21st-century Argentine male actors